William Charles Attewell (January 21, 1932 – December 24, 2021) is a former Canadian politician.

A corporate executive, Attewell was first elected to the House of Commons of Canada as the Progressive Conservative Member of Parliament for Don Valley East defeating Liberal cabinet minister David Smith in the 1984 federal election that brought Brian Mulroney to power.

As a result of redistribution, he decided to move to the riding of Markham, just outside Toronto, where he owned property, for the 1988 federal election leaving his former riding to former East York mayor Alan Redway who retained the riding for the Tories.

Attewell won Markham, defeating Liberal candidate Jag Bhaduria and former Conservative MP John Gamble who was running as an independent.

A backbencher throughout the Mulroney years, Attewell was appointed parliamentary secretary to Prime Minister Kim Campbell after she won the 1993 Progressive Conservative leadership convention. He ran in the 1993 federal election but was defeated by an almost two-to-one margin in Markham—Whitchurch—Stouffville by Bhaduria.

Attewell opposed the merger of the Progressive Conservative Party with the Canadian Alliance. He should not be mistaken for Bill Attwell who was president of the Oak Ridges—Markham federal Liberal riding association in 2007.

Electoral record

References

1932 births
2021 deaths
Living people
Members of the House of Commons of Canada from Ontario
Politicians from Saint John, New Brunswick
Progressive Conservative Party of Canada MPs